Jantar Mantar or Vedh Shala is located in the holy city of New Ujjain. It is an observatory built by Maharaja Jai Singh II in 1725 which consists of 13 architectural astronomy instruments. The observatory is one of the five observatories built by Maharaja Jai Singh II when he was governor of Ujjain.

Vedh Shala was constructed with the aim of measuring local time, altitude (of the place) and also to measure declination of the Sun, stars and planets and to determine eclipses. Motion, speed and properties of stars and planets were also recorded using several special instruments.

Jai Singh II was also an astronomer and had deep interest in science and astronomy. In early 18th century, he sent his scholars to several countries to study design, construction and technology of the observatories and also the prevalent technology. The scholars returned with their observations and many manuals on astronomy. Subsequently between 1724 and 1737, Jai Singh II had five observatories constructed in Jaipur, Mathura, New Delhi, Ujjain and in Varanasi.

Geographically, the city of Ujjain is considered the Greenwich of India due to the fact that the first meridian of longitude in the Indian tradition passes through it. Moreover, it sits on the tropic of cancer.

References

External links
 Wikikmapia

History of Malwa
Tourist attractions in Ujjain
Buildings and structures in Ujjain
Monuments and memorials in Madhya Pradesh
Culture of Ujjain